Desmond McAleenan (12 June 1967 – 26 February 2021) was an Irish-American soccer player and coach who played as a goalkeeper.

Career
Born in Dublin, Ireland, McAleenan grew up in Artane, a suburb of the city. He played schoolboy football with Stella Maris.

He moved to the United States in 1988 and played for Central Connecticut State University for four years. He played professionally in the USL Championship for Connecticut Wolves from 1992 to 1995 and for Albany Alleycats.

He was with the MetroStars franchise as goalkeeping coach for New York Red Bulls in Major League Soccer from 2002 until his dismissal on 28 February 2011. He coached goalkeepers including Tim Howard and US full internationals Tony Meola and Jonny Walker.

He served as goalkeeping coach for the Colombia national team under manager Carlos Queiroz.

He died on 26 February 2021, aged 53.

References

External links
 Des's Goalkeeper Workout (PDF) 
 Ringing the opening bell at NASDAQ

1967 births
2021 deaths
People from Artane, Dublin
Republic of Ireland association footballers
Association football goalkeepers
USISL players
USL Second Division players
Stella Maris F.C. players
Connecticut Wolves players
Albany Alleycats players
American soccer coaches
New York Red Bulls non-playing staff
Republic of Ireland expatriate association footballers
Central Connecticut State University alumni
Irish emigrants to the United States